The Order of Sidonia was the German Kingdom of Saxony’s chivalric order for women. Created 14 March 1871 by King John, the order was granted to female members of the Saxon nobility until the fall of the monarchy in 1918. It was named for the duchess consort of Saxony and margravine consort of Meissen, née princess Sidonia of Bohemia.

Insignia
Members of the Sidonian Order wore a Maltese cross of gold and enamel, suspended from a purple bow with white and green stripes. Members of the royal family wore a sash instead of the bow. At the apex of the Maltese cross, a medallion featured an image of a helmeted female figure, surrounded with the name “Sidonia”.

Sources 
 Tagore, Rajah Sir Sourindro Mohun. The Orders of Knighthood, British and Foreign. Calcutta: The Catholic Orphan Press, 1884.

Sidonia, Order of
Sidonia Order of
Sidonia, Order of
Orders, decorations, and medals of Saxony